Alexander Petkovic (born 31 May 1980, Munich, Germany) is a German professional boxer of Bosnian descent. He challenged once for the WBO world cruiserweight title in 2003.

Career
Petkovic made his pro debut in 1997 as a cruiserweight and went undefeated in 31 fights before losing to Johnny Nelson in his challenge for the WBO Cruiserweight title. Since then he's only lost three other fights in the cruiserweight division, including a loss to fellow German Firat Arslan in a WBO Inter-Continental cruiserweight title fight.

Professional boxing record

|-
|align="center" colspan=8|50 Wins (27 knockouts, 22 decisions), 4 Losses (3 knockouts, 1 decision), 4 Draws 
|-
| align="center" style="border-style: none none solid solid; background: #e3e3e3"|Result
| align="center" style="border-style: none none solid solid; background: #e3e3e3"|Record
| align="center" style="border-style: none none solid solid; background: #e3e3e3"|Opponent
| align="center" style="border-style: none none solid solid; background: #e3e3e3"|Type
| align="center" style="border-style: none none solid solid; background: #e3e3e3"|Round
| align="center" style="border-style: none none solid solid; background: #e3e3e3"|Date
| align="center" style="border-style: none none solid solid; background: #e3e3e3"|Location
| align="center" style="border-style: none none solid solid; background: #e3e3e3"|Notes
|-align=center
|Win
|
|align=left| Raymond Ochieng
|TD
|10 (12)
|24/01/2015
|align=left| ASV Halle, Dachau, Bayern, Germany
|align=left|
|-
|Win
|
|align=left| Marino Goles
|RTD
|3 (12)
|10/05/2014
|align=left| Europahalle, Karlsruhe, Baden-Württemberg, Germany
|align=left|
|-
|Win
|
|align=left| Chupaki Chipindi
|KO
|4 (12)
|31/11/2013
|align=left| ASV Halle, Dachau, Bayern, Germany
|align=left|
|-
|Win
|
|align=left| Timo Hoffmann
|UD
|12
|11/05/2013
|align=left| Ufgauhalle, Karlsruhe, Baden-Württemberg, Germany
|align=left|
|-
|Win
|
|align=left| Senad Hadzic
|TKO
|2 (8)
|09/03/2013
|align=left| CU Arena, Hamburg, Germany
|align=left|
|-
|Win
|
|align=left| Adnan Buharalija
|TKO
|2 (12)
|15/12/2012
|align=left| Rheinstetten, Baden-Württemberg, Germany
|align=left|
|-
|Win
|
|align=left| Muhammed Ali Durmaz
|TKO
|1 (8)
|14/07/2012
|align=left| Impact Gym, Munich, Bayern, Germany
|align=left|
|-
|Win
|
|align=left| Patrick Berger
|TKO
|2 (12)
|21/04/2012
|align=left| Hotel Marsoel, Chur, Switzerland
|align=left|
|-
|Win
|
|align=left| Ergin Solmaz
|RTD
|2
|03/03/2012
|align=left| Munich, Bayern, Germany
|align=left|
|-
|Win
|
|align=left| Cisse Salif
|DQ
|6
|14/10/2011
|align=left| Obertraubling, Bayern, Germany
|align=left|
|-
|Win
|
|align=left| Joseph "Hungry Lion" Marwa
|UD
|12
|20/05/2011
|align=left| Munich, Bayern, Germany
|align=left|
|-
|style="background:#abcdef;"|Draw
|
|align=left| Timo Hoffmann
|MD
|12
|23/10/2010
|align=left| Riesa, Sachsen, Germany
|align=left|
|-
|Win
|
|align=left| Jermaine Bland
|TKO
|4
|30/05/2010
|align=left| Ingolstadt, Bayern, Germany
|align=left|
|-
|Win
|
|align=left| Tani Dima
|PTS
|6
|13/05/2010
|align=left| Munich, Bayern, Germany
|align=left|
|-
|Win
|
|align=left| Tani Dima
|TKO
|3
|10/04/2010
|align=left| Augsburg, Bayern, Germany
|align=left|
|-
|Win
|
|align=left| Ergin Solmaz
|TKO
|2
|21/12/2009
|align=left| Munich, Bayern, Germany
|align=left|
|-
|Win
|
|align=left| Harry Duiven, Jr.
|UD
|6
|10/03/2007
|align=left| Mannheim, Baden-Württemberg, Germany
|align=left|
|-
|Win
|
|align=left| Rudolf Murko
|TKO
|2
|09/02/2007
|align=left| Munich, Bayern, Germany
|align=left|
|-
|Win
|
|align=left| Bruce Oezbek
|KO
|2
|14/10/2006
|align=left| Dvorana Borik, Bosnia and Herzegovina
|align=left|
|-
|Loss
|
|align=left| Kamel Amrane
|KO
|9
|24/01/2006
|align=left| Wandsbek, Hamburg, Germany
|align=left|
|-
|Win
|
|align=left| Vadym Safonov
|UD
|8
|02/07/2005
|align=left| Altona, Hamburg, Germany
|align=left|
|-
|Win
|
|align=left| Roberto Coelho
|UD
|8
|07/05/2005
|align=left| Braunschweig, Niedersachsen, Germany
|align=left|
|-
|Loss
|
|align=left| Firat Arslan
|TKO
|7
|18/01/2005
|align=left| Cuxhaven, Niedersachsen, Germany
|align=left|
|-
|Win
|
|align=left| Robert Sulgan
|UD
|8
|16/11/2004
|align=left| Cuxhaven, Niedersachsen, Germany
|align=left|
|-
|Win
|
|align=left| "Dangerous" Damon Reed
|UD
|8
|18/09/2004
|align=left| Leverkusen, Nordrhein-Westfalen, Germany
|align=left|
|-
|Loss
|
|align=left| Baldwin "Black Stone" Hlongwane
|TKO
|8
|14/02/2004
|align=left| Stuttgart, Baden-Württemberg, Germany
|align=left|
|-
|Loss
|
|align=left| Johnny "Entertainer" Nelson
|MD
|12
|15/11/2003
|align=left| Bayreuth, Bayern, Germany
|align=left|
|-
|Win
|
|align=left| Sergio Martin Beaz
|UD
|8
|30/08/2003
|align=left| Munich, Bayern, Germany
|align=left|
|-
|Win
|
|align=left| Alain Simon
|TKO
|9
|29/03/2003
|align=left| Altona, Hamburg, Germany
|align=left|
|-
|Win
|
|align=left| Valeri Semiskur
|TKO
|2
|08/02/2003
|align=left| Neukoeln, Berlin, Germany
|align=left|
|-
|Win
|
|align=left| John "Battleship" Battle
|TKO
|6
|07/12/2002
|align=left| Las Vegas, Nevada, United States
|align=left|
|-
|Win
|
|align=left| Csaba Olah
|TKO
|5
|05/10/2002
|align=left| Debrecen, Hungary
|align=left|
|-
|style="background:#abcdef;"|Draw
|
|align=left| Ruediger May
|PTS
|12
|20/07/2002
|align=left| Dortmund, Nordrhein-Westfalen, Germany
|align=left|
|-
|Win
|
|align=left| Eric "The Red" French
|TKO
|4
|20/04/2002
|align=left| Gdańsk, Poland
|align=left|
|-
|Win
|
|align=left| Csaba Olah
|PTS
|8
|08/02/2002
|align=left| Braunschweig, Niedersachsen, Germany
|align=left|
|-
|Win
|
|align=left| Milan Konecny
|TKO
|5
|24/11/2001
|align=left| Wandsbek, Hamburg, Germany
|align=left|
|-
|Win
|
|align=left| Csaba Olah
|TKO
|4
|29/09/2001
|align=left| Wandsbek, Hamburg, Germany
|align=left|
|-
|Win
|
|align=left| Henry Mobio
|PTS
|6
|28/07/2001
|align=left| Neukoeln, Berlin, Germany
|align=left|
|-
|Win
|
|align=left| Eduardo Franca
|PTS
|6
|05/05/2001
|align=left| Braunschweig, Niedersachsen, Germany
|align=left|
|-
|Win
|
|align=left| Mohamed Ali Bouraoui
|TKO
|2
|24/03/2001
|align=left| Munich, Bayern, Germany
|align=left|
|-
|Win
|
|align=left| Larry Prather
|PTS
|6
|24/02/2001
|align=left| Alsterdorf, Hamburg, Germany
|align=left|
|-
|Win
|
|align=left| Dennis "The Menace" McKinney
|PTS
|6
|05/12/2000
|align=left| Wandsbek, Hamburg, Germany
|align=left|
|-
|Win
|
|align=left| Sylvester Petrovic
|TKO
|1
|01/10/2000
|align=left| Wandsbek, Hamburg, Germany
|align=left|
|-
|Win
|
|align=left| Samuel Florimond
|PTS
|6
|28/05/2000
|align=left| Wandsbek, Hamburg, Germany
|align=left|
|-
|Win
|
|align=left| Rene Janvier
|PTS
|6
|18/03/2000
|align=left| Alsterdorf, Hamburg, Germany
|align=left|
|-
|Win
|
|align=left| Zaire Patterson
|TKO
|4
|19/02/2000
|align=left| Neukoeln, Berlin, Germany
|align=left|
|-
|Win
|
|align=left| Laszlo Kovacs
|TKO
|4
|23/10/1999
|align=left| Frankfurt, Hessen, Germany
|align=left|
|-
|style="background:#abcdef;"|Draw
|
|align=left| Silvio Meinel
|PTS
|6
|18/09/1999
|align=left| Stuttgart, Baden-Württemberg, Germany
|align=left|
|-
|Win
|
|align=left| Gabor Ott
|KO
|1
|10/07/1999
|align=left| Augsburg, Bayern, Germany
|align=left|
|-
|Win
|
|align=left| Yves Monsieur
|PTS
|4
|24/04/1999
|align=left| Munich, Bayern, Germany
|align=left|
|-
|Win
|
|align=left| Julius Gal
|PTS
|4
|13/02/1999
|align=left| Stuttgart, Baden-Württemberg, Germany
|align=left|
|-
|Win
|
|align=left| Ignacio Orsola
|KO
|2
|14/11/1998
|align=left| Munich, Bayern, Germany
|align=left|
|-
|Win
|
|align=left| Frank Wuestenberghs
|PTS
|4
|03/10/1998
|align=left| Augsburg, Bayern, Germany
|align=left|
|-
|style="background:#abcdef;"|Draw
|
|align=left| Timmy Punch
|TD
|3
|10/07/1998
|align=left| Munich, Bayern, Germany
|align=left|
|-
|Win
|
|align=left| Frank Wuestenberghs
|PTS
|4
|02/05/1998
|align=left| Lübeck, Schleswig-Holstein, Germany
|align=left|
|-
|Win
|
|align=left| Ferousi Ilunga
|KO
|1
|30/01/1998
|align=left| Munich, Bayern, Germany
|align=left|
|-
|Win
|
|align=left| Bruno Wuestenberghs
|PTS
|4
|20/12/1997
|align=left| Offenburg, Baden-Württemberg, Germany
|align=left|
|-
|Win
|
|align=left| Sandor Szakaly
|KO
|1
|13/12/1997
|align=left| Alsterdorf, Hamburg, Germany
|align=left|
|}

References

Living people
German people of Bosnia and Herzegovina descent
German people of Serbian descent
Cruiserweight boxers
1980 births
German male boxers
Sportspeople from Munich